Brian Sopatyk (born May 31, 1947) is a retired Canadian football player who played for the BC Lions. He played college football at Boise State University. During the 1960s, he played for the Saskatoon Hilltops.

His brother Jeff also played football.

References

1947 births
Living people
BC Lions players
Boise State Broncos football players
Canadian football offensive linemen